North Guardian Angel is a 7,395-foot (2,254 meter) elevation summit located in Zion National Park, in Washington County of southwest Utah, United States.

Description

Its nearest neighbor is South Guardian Angel,  to the south. The Subway, a small, uniquely-shaped slot canyon, is set between these two peaks. The North Guardian Angel name was officially adopted in 1934 by the U.S. Board on Geographic Names. Precipitation runoff from this mountain drains into North Creek, a tributary of the Virgin River.

Climate
Spring and fall are the most favorable seasons to visit North Guardian Angel. According to the Köppen climate classification system, it is located in a Cold semi-arid climate zone, which is defined by the coldest month having an average mean temperature below 32 °F (0 °C), and at least 50% of the total annual precipitation being received during the spring and summer.

Gallery

See also

 List of mountains in Utah
 Geology of the Zion and Kolob canyons area
 Colorado Plateau

References

External links

 Zion National Park National Park Service
 North Guardian Angel: Weather forecast
 North Guardian Angel climbing: mountainproject.com

Mountains of Utah
Zion National Park
Mountains of Washington County, Utah
Sandstone formations of the United States
Landforms of Washington County, Utah
North American 2000 m summits